Haematomma is a genus of crustose lichens established by Abramo Bartolommeo Massalongo in 1852. It is the sole genus in the Haematommataceae, a family circumscribed by Josef Hafellner in 1984. Commonly called bloodstain lichens, the species assigned to this genus are widely distributed in tropical and temperate areas.

The genus name Haematomma means "bloody eye", a reference to the color of the lichen's apothecia.

Species
, Species Fungorum accepts 22 species in the genus Haematomma:
Haematomma accolens 
Haematomma africanum 
Haematomma alborussulum 
Haematomma caperaticum 
Haematomma collatum 
Haematomma eremaeum 
Haematomma fenzlianum 
Haematomma flexuosum 
Haematomma fluorescens 
Haematomma gallowayi 
Haematomma infuscum 
Haematomma nicoyense 
Haematomma nothofagi 
Haematomma ochroleucum 
Haematomma parda 
Haematomma persoonii 
Haematomma pluriseptatum 
Haematomma puniceum 
Haematomma rubidum 
Haematomma rufidulum 
Haematomma similis 
Haematomma sorediatum 
Haematomma staigeriae 
Haematomma stevensiae

References

 
Lichen genera
Lecanorales genera
Taxa described in 1852
Taxa named by Abramo Bartolommeo Massalongo